The 2014 ITM 500 Auckland was a motor race meeting for the Australian sedan-based V8 Supercars. It was the fourth event of the 2014 International V8 Supercars Championship. It was held on the weekend of 25–27 April at the Pukekohe Park Raceway, near Pukekohe, New Zealand.

The 2014 event marked the first - and so far only - time a Ford driver has won the overall round at Pukekohe, with Mark Winterbottom winning the Jason Richards Memorial Trophy.

Race results

Race 10

Qualifying

Race

Race 11

Qualifying

Race

Race 12

Qualifying

Race

Race 13

Qualifying

Race

References 

ITM 500 Auckland
2014 in New Zealand motorsport
April 2014 sports events in New Zealand